Bartolomeo II della Scala (died 12 July 1381) was lord of Verona from 1375 until his death, together with his brother Antonio I della Scala.

The illegitimate son of Cansignorio della Scala, he obtained the power in Verona after the latter's death by assassinating Cansignorio's brother, Paolo Alboino. He ruled Verona, who was then in bankruptcy and forced to accept the protectorate of Bernabò Visconti.

After a period of moderate reign, Bartolomeo was assassinated by his brother Antonio.

1381 deaths
Medieval murder victims
Assassinated Italian people
Italian assassins
Bartolomeo 2
Assassins of heads of state
Year of birth unknown
Lords of Verona
14th-century murderers
14th-century Italian nobility